Soundtrack is the seventh studio album of English rock band Modern English. The first to be released on Darla Records, Soundtrack marks a new territory for the band, as they continue on making music nearly 30 years after their debut album. The album was produced by Hugh Jones.

Track listing

Personnel
Robbie Grey: Vocals
Steven Walker: Guitars
Matthew Shipley: Keyboards
Nik Williams: Bass
Jon Solomon: Drums

References

2010 albums
Modern English (band) albums